George Shedden may refer to a member of the Shedden trading family of Spring Hill, East Cowes, Isle of Wight:

George Shedden  (c.1769–1855)
George Shedden  (c.1856-1937)
George Powell-Shedden (1916-1994)